The Ohio Defense Force (ODF) is a privately organized militia in the state of Ohio. The Ohio Defense Force is not a part of the organized military of Ohio, which consists of the Ohio National Guard, the Ohio Naval Militia, and the Ohio Military Reserve. Rather, it is organized, led, and staffed by private citizens.

The Ohio Defense Force, originally named the Southeastern Ohio Defense Force, was founded in 1989 as a non-profit corporation. In 2004, the organization decided to expand statewide and was renamed the Ohio Defense Force.

References

External links
 Official Website

1989 establishments in Ohio
Organizations based in Ohio
Organizations established in 1989
Paramilitary organizations based in the United States